Amme Narayana is a 1984 Indian Malayalam film, directed by N. P. Suresh and produced by Purushan Alappuzha. The film stars Prem Nazir, Srividya, Sukumaran and Baby Shalini in the lead roles. The film has musical score by A. T. Ummer.

Cast
Prem Nazir as Vedan / Senadhipathi Chanthu / Vilwamangalam Swamikal
Srividya as Aadhi Paraashakthi / Lakshmi / Saraswathi / Parvathi / Chottanikkara Amma
Sukumaran as Suresh
Baby Shalini
Shankar
Menaka
Jagannatha Varma
Mala Aravindan as Kuttan Namboothiri
Ranipadmini as Naanikkutti (Yakshi)
Sathyakala as Rajeshwari
Shanavas
Sumithra as Vedante Bhaarya

Soundtrack
The music was composed by A. T. Ummer and the lyrics were written by Poovachal Khader, Koorkkancheri Sugathan.

References

External links
 

1984 films
1980s Malayalam-language films
Films directed by N. P. Suresh